Patrick Singleton  (born October 15, 1974) is a Bermudian luger who competed in the late 1990s and early 2000s before going into skeleton in 2002. In 1998, Singleton finished 27th in the men's singles event while he finished 37th in the same event four years later.

He finished 19th in the men's skeleton event at the 2006 Winter Olympics in Turin. He suffered an injury shortly before the 2010 Winter Olympics in Vancouver and did not compete.

Singleton's best finish at the FIBT World Championships was 24th at Calgary in 2005.

References

2006 men's skeleton results

Skeletonsport.com profile
Sports-Reference.com profile
 Bernews:Patrick Singleton Bio, Photos

1974 births
People educated at Rannoch School
Bermudian male lugers
Bermudian male skeleton racers
Living people
Lugers at the 1998 Winter Olympics
Lugers at the 2002 Winter Olympics
Olympic lugers of Bermuda
Olympic skeleton racers of Bermuda
Skeleton racers at the 2006 Winter Olympics